Matilal Hansda  is an Indian politician and a member of the Communist Party of India (Marxist) political party. He was elected to the Lok Sabha, lower house of the Parliament of India in 1980, 1984 and 1989 from Jhargram constituency in West Bengal.

References

External links
Official biographical sketch in Parliament of India website

1945 births
India MPs 1980–1984
India MPs 1984–1989
India MPs 1989–1991
Lok Sabha members from West Bengal
Living people
Communist Party of India (Marxist) politicians from West Bengal
People from Paschim Medinipur district